Luis Alberto Villarroel Vera (born July 2, 1981, in Caracas, Distrito Capital) is a male diver from Venezuela, who competed at the 2000 Summer Olympics for his native country. He claimed three medals at the 2008 South American Swimming Championships in São Paulo.

References

1981 births
Living people
Venezuelan male divers
Divers at the 2000 Summer Olympics
Divers at the 2007 Pan American Games
Olympic divers of Venezuela
Sportspeople from Caracas
Central American and Caribbean Games bronze medalists for Venezuela
Divers at the 2003 Pan American Games
Competitors at the 2006 Central American and Caribbean Games
Central American and Caribbean Games medalists in diving
Pan American Games competitors for Venezuela
21st-century Venezuelan people